Yuriy Oleksiyovych Hetman (born 27 January 1971) is a retired professional Ukrainian football forward.

Career
Hetman and his brother, Oleksiy, played football for Ukrainian Second League side FC Dynamo Luhansk during the 1994–95 season.

Hetman became the second highest scorer after Oleksiy Antyukhin when he scored 21 goals for Metalurh Mariupol during the 1996–97 Ukrainian First League season.

He is the older brother of Oleksiy Hetman.

References 

1971 births
People from Sovetsky District, Saratov Oblast
Living people
Ukrainian footballers
Association football forwards
FC Khartsyzk players
FC Shakhtar-2 Donetsk players
FC Arsenal Kyiv players
FC Nyva Myronivka players
FC Dynamo Luhansk players
FC Mariupol players
FC Yevropa Pryluky players
FC Shakhtar Luhansk players
FC Monolit Kostiantynivka players
FC Fakel Varva players
FC Dnipro Cherkasy players
Ukrainian Premier League players
Ukrainian First League players
Ukrainian Second League players